Victor (died August 388AD) was a Western Roman emperor from either 383/384 or 387 to August 388. He was the son of the magister militum Magnus Maximus, who later became a usurper of the Western Roman Empire, in opposition to Gratian. Maximus rose up  in 383, and was recognized as the legitimate emperor in the west by Theodosius I. Victor was elevated to augustus of the Western Roman Empire in either 383/384 or mid-387, making him co-emperor with his father. Maximus invaded Italy in 387, to depose Valentinian II, the brother and successor of the late Gratian. Because of Maximus' invasion, Theodosius invaded the Western Empire in 388. Theodosius defeated Maximus in two battles in Pannonia, before crushing his army at Aquilea, and capturing Maximus. Maximus was executed on 28 August 388. His death was followed quickly by that of Victor, who was executed in Trier by the Frankish general Arbogast.

History
Flavius Victor was born at an unknown date, to Magnus Maximus, the magister militum per Gallias ('Master of the Soldiers in Gaul'), and future usurper of the Western Roman Empire. Maximus was declared emperor in July 383AD while in Britain, in opposition to Gratian. Maximus held control over both Gaul and Spain, and was recognized by Theodosius I, the Eastern Roman Emperor, as the true Western Roman Emperor.

Victor was elevated to augustus of the Western Roman Empire either 383/384 or mid-387, making him co-emperor with his father Magnus Maximus. It is considered highly likely that Maximus had the intent of establishing a dynasty, as the number of coins minted that bore Victor's image was greater even than the number bearing Maximus'.

Magnus Maximus invaded Italy in late 387, in order to depose Valentinian II, the brother of Gratian. He gained control of Italy, although he failed to capture Valentinian, who fled to Thessalonica in the Eastern Roman Empire. Once there, Valentinian sent multiple appeals to Theodosius, although for several months they were ignored. Theodosius I then agreed to restore Valentinian II to the throne, although the reasoning for this is disputed. Rufinus says that Valentinian agreed to convert to Orthodoxy, whereas Eunapius says that Valentinian offered his sister, Galla, in marriage to Theodosius, whose wife had recently died, in exchange for assistance in regaining the throne. News that Theodosius was marching to invade the Western Roman Empire arrived in late spring 388, leading Maximus to rush to put together a defence force. His army was defeated twice in Pannonia, at Siscia and Poetovio, before retreating to Italy, where they were crushed in battle on 28 August 388, near Aquilea. During this battle, Maximus himself was captured, and quickly beheaded. Victor, who was still in Gaul, was executed in Trier by the Frankish general Arbogast in the same month.

Notes

References

Citations

Bibliography

 

4th-century births
388 deaths
4th-century executions
4th-century murdered monarchs
4th-century Roman usurpers
Executed Roman emperors
People executed by the Roman Empire
Sons of Roman emperors
Valentinianic dynasty